Hercosestria is an extinct genus of brachiopods from the Lower and Middle Permian. They were important reef-forming organisms because of their conical shapes, attaching spines, and gregarious habits. It is related to Richthofenia.
Species of the genus have been found in Texas (H. cribrosa and H. laevis) and Guatemala (H. notialis).

References 

Permian brachiopods
Permian animals of North America
Prehistoric brachiopod genera
Productida